Phenylobacterium aquaticum is a Gram negative, strictly aerobic, non-spore-forming and non-motile bacterium from the genus of Phenylobacterium which has been isolated from a reservoir of a water purifier.

References

External links
Type strain of Phenylobacterium aquaticum at BacDive -  the Bacterial Diversity Metadatabase

Caulobacterales
Bacteria described in 2015